Hypolimnas dexithea (Madagascar diadem) is a species of Hypolimnas butterfly endemic to Madagascar. The species was described in 1863 by William Chapman Hewitson from a specimen collected by J. Caldwell from Antananarivo in Madagascar. It later became one of the species targeted by collectors on account of its size and colour.

Additional images

References

dexithea
Butterflies of Africa
Endemic fauna of Madagascar
Lepidoptera of Madagascar
Butterflies described in 1863
Taxa named by William Chapman Hewitson